Eunice Kazembe (1952 – 28 October 2013) was a Malawian politician who was appointed Minister of Industry and Trade in the cabinet of Malawi in 2009.
On 26 April 2012 President Joyce Banda named her new cabinet.  Kazembe became minister of Education.

Eunice Kazembe was born in 1952. 
She obtained a Bachelor of Commerce degree from Carleton University, Ottawa, and a Masters in Business Administration from Indiana University.
She was at one time General Manager of the Agricultural Development and Marketing Corporation (Malawi), and Malawi's Ambassador to the Republic of China (Taiwan). 
Kazembe was a Chief Advisor to the President on Urban Development from 2005 to 2009, and served as Minister of Trade and Industry, and Minister of Mines, Energy and Natural Resources.
She is a trustee and co-founder of Chisomo Children’s Club.

Kazembe was elected a Member of Parliament for Chiradzulu South in May 2009, running on the Democratic Progressive Party (DPP) platform.
She was appointed Minister of Industry and Trade in the cabinet that became effective on 15 June 2009.
She retained this position in the cabinet announced on 9 August 2010.

References

1952 births
2013 deaths
Government ministers of Malawi
Democratic Progressive Party (Malawi) politicians
Carleton University alumni
Indiana University alumni
Ambassadors of Malawi to Taiwan
Women government ministers of Malawi
21st-century Malawian women politicians
21st-century Malawian politicians
Malawian women diplomats
Women ambassadors